Nicolae Tanovițchii (born 23 December 1993) is a Moldovan professional racing cyclist, who last rode for UCI Continental team . He rode in the men's team time trial at the 2015 UCI Road World Championships.

Major results

2012
 3rd Time trial, National Road Championships
2013
 1st  Time trial, National Under-23 Road Championships
 9th Overall Tour of Bulgaria
1st Young rider classification
2014
 3rd Time trial, National Road Championships
2015
 10th Winston-Salem Cycling Classic
2016
 7th The Reading 120
2017
 National Road Championships
1st  Time trial
1st  Road race
 3rd Overall Tour of Szeklerland
1st Prologue
 3rd Overall Tour of Bulgaria North
 3rd Coppa della Pace
2018
 National Road Championships
1st  Time trial
2nd Road race
 1st Overall Tour of Szeklerland
1st Stage 4a (ITT)
 3rd Overall Grand Prix Cycliste de Gemenc

References

External links
 

1993 births
Living people
Moldovan male cyclists
Place of birth missing (living people)